Zanzibar is a 2002 novel by Giles Foden. It is about a marine biologist working in Zanzibar, who meets an American embassy employee while in Dar es Salaam, embroiling them both in a terrorist conspiracy. The book discusses the threat of al-Qaeda and Osama bin Laden before September 11 attacks.

References

2002 British novels
Zanzibar in fiction
Novels set in Tanzania
Novels about terrorism
Faber and Faber books